Margaret Christian Jay, Baroness Jay ( Garnett; 4 January 1913 – 21 January 2008) was an English Labour councillor.

Education and professional life
As a young girl, Garnett attended St Paul's Girls' School in London, where she befriended Shiela Grant Duff. She studied economics at Somerville College, Oxford, from 1931 to 1933, when she married Douglas Jay, who had tutored her in preparation for her Oxford University entrance exams. Joining the Labour Party, she was recruited by Herbert Morrison to be a candidate for the London County Council (LCC); from 1934, she represented Hackney South, then Battersea South, and finally Battersea North. Later, she was elected to the new Greater London Council before losing her seat in 1967. She remained involved in local politics, as chair of the Heath and Old Hampstead Society from 1967 to 1989, and president from 1993-2004, work she described as "the most worthwhile and satisfying in my life." On her death, she was described by a local newspaper as the "uncrowned queen of Hampstead".

She left the Labour Party in 1981 for the newly formed Social Democratic Party, rejoining only after Gordon Brown became Prime Minister. She was the last survivor of the "Hampstead middle-class Labour grandes dames" whom Morrison had groomed to take over the LCC.

Family
She married politician Douglas Jay in 1933, aged 20. They had four children, but the marriage ended in divorce. A son, Peter Jay, is a journalist, leading economist and a former British Ambassador to the United States. Peter Jay was married Margaret Callaghan, the daughter of Prime Minister of the United Kingdom and Leader of the Labour Party Jim Callaghan, who went onto become Leader of the House of Lords and Minister for Women and Equalities under Tony Blair. Their twin daughters, Helen and Catherine, achieved a fashionable profile in the 1960s. At one time her son-in-law, married to Helen, was Rupert Pennant-Rea, a former deputy Governor of the Bank of England.

Her niece is Virginia Bottomley, Baroness Bottomley of Nettlestone, a Conservative politician and life peer. Her nephew is Lord Hunt of Chesterton, and her great-nephew is Tristram Hunt, former Member of Parliament for Stoke-on-Trent Central and Shadow Secretary of State for Education, and now Director of the Victoria and Albert Museum.

External links
The Papers of Peggy Jay at the Churchill Archives Centre

References 

1913 births
2008 deaths
Labour Party (UK) councillors
Members of London County Council
Members of the Fabian Society
Members of the Greater London Council
Alumni of Somerville College, Oxford
People educated at St Paul's Girls' School
Place of birth missing
Place of death missing
Social Democratic Party (UK) politicians
Spouses of life peers
British baronesses
Women councillors in England